Johan Erik Evald Hultman (10 April 1876 – 9 November 1958) was a Swedish diplomat.

Career
Hultman was born in Malmö, Sweden, the son of factory owner Johan Hultman and his wife Eveline (née Svensson). He passed studentexamen in 1893 and after a few years of employment in a store, Hultman devoted himself to studying abroad for some years. He received a Doctor of Philosophy degree from Uppsala University in 1903 with a major in language and a Juris utriusque candidate degree in 1905. Hultman served as an assistant at the Ministry of Finance in 1905 before becoming an attaché at the Ministry for Foreign Affairs in 1906. 

He served as an attaché in London in 1906 and then in Cape Town. Hultman was then vice consul in Saint Petersburg and Arkhangelsk in 1909 and consul general in Shanghai in 1911. Hultman was chargé d'affaires in Helsinki in 1920 and consul general in Hamburg in 1921. He was then envoy in Tokyo in from 1928 to 1936, envoy in Beijing from 1929 to 1936 (accredited from Tokyo) and envoy in Bangkok from 1931 to 1936 (accredited from Tokyo).

Personal life
In 1910 he married Ella Eklund (1881–1952), the daughter of the pharmacist Edward Eklund and Gretchen (née Winge). Hultman was the father of Brita (1912–1975). Hultman died on 9 November 1958 and was buried at the Old Cemetery in his hometown Malmö.

Awards and decorations
Hultman's awards:
Commander First Class of the Order of the Polar Star
Commander First Class of the Order of Vasa
First Class of the Order of the Sacred Treasure
First Class of the Order of Brilliant Jade
First Class of the Order of the Crown of Siam
Grand Cross of the Order of Merit of the Austrian Republic
Second Class of the Order of the Golden Grain
Knight Third Class of the Order of Saint Anna
Knight Third Class of the Order of Saint Stanislaus

References

1876 births
1958 deaths
Consuls-general of Sweden
Ambassadors of Sweden to China
Ambassadors of Sweden to Japan
Ambassadors of Sweden to Thailand
People from Malmö
Uppsala University alumni
Commanders First Class of the Order of the Polar Star
Commanders First Class of the Order of Vasa